Anne Akiko Meyers is an American concert violinist. Meyers was the top-selling classical instrumentalist of 2014 on Billboard's traditional classical charts.

Early life and education 
The daughter of an artist and a college president, Meyers was born in California. Her mother is of Japanese descent, and her father American. She was raised in Southern California, studied with Shirley Helmick, and then with Alice and Eleonore Schoenfeld at the preparatory division of the University of Southern California's Thornton School of Music in Los Angeles. In 1980, the Thornton School of Music and its preparatory division ended their relationship, and the preparatory division moved locations and was renamed the Colburn School.

She then studied with Josef Gingold at Indiana University, and with Dorothy DeLay, Felix Galimir, and Masao Kawasaki at the Juilliard School in New York City. She graduated from Juilliard at age 20 and began touring internationally and recording.

Early career 
Described as a child prodigy after her debut with a local community orchestra at the age of 7, she subsequently performed with the Los Angeles Philharmonic, twice on The Tonight Show with Johnny Carson at age 11, the Emmy Award Show and the New York Philharmonic  at age 12.

When she was 16, Meyers signed with ICM Artists and began touring and recording. She recorded her first album in London at the Abbey Road Studios, featuring the Barber and Bruch Concertos with the Royal Philharmonic Orchestra. After signing  an RCA Victor Red Seal contract at the age of 21, she recorded an extensive discography.

Instruments 
Meyers has lifetime use of the 1741 Vieuxtemps Guarneri "del Gesu". She previously toured with a 1730 Stradivarius violin called the Royal Spanish, and a 1697 Stradivarius called the Molitor Stradivarius.   In her recording of Bach's Concerto in D minor for Two Violins, BWV 1043,  she plays both parts—one part on the "Royal Spanish"  and the other on the "Molitor."

Professional career 
Meyers has performed as guest soloist with the Philadelphia Orchestra, Royal Philharmonic Orchestra, Vienna Symphony, and Orchestre de Paris. She also has played solo recitals in Carnegie Hall, the Hollywood Bowl, and Lincoln Center.

Meyers collaborated with the singer Michael Bolton. She was also the special guest violinist in Il Divo's Christmas Tour 2009 and toured with jazz and pop trumpeter Chris Botti in 2010. On September 11, 2015, Naïve Classiques released "Passacaglia" Works for violin and orchestra by Arvo Pärt with MDR Leipzig Radio Symphony Orchestra (Kristjan Jarvi conducting), in celebration of Pärt's 80th birthday.

The Engagements written by novelist J. Courtney Sullivan is loosely based on Meyers's career; it  was one of People Magazine's Top 10 Books of the Year in 2014. Meyers also played the violinist character, Violetta, in Crumpet the Trumpet by children's book author and illustrator, Kristine Papillon.  Meyers' recording of Einojuhani Rautavaara's Fantasia was the only classical instrumental work included by NPR in their list of 100 best songs of 2017.

Commissions and premieres 

Works written expressly for Meyers include the Somei Satoh Violin Concerto, recorded live with Tetsuji Honna and the Tokyo Metropolitan Symphony Orchestra in 2002, and Angelfire by Joseph Schwantner, premiered live in 2002 at the Kennedy Center conducted by Marin Alsop and recorded in 2004 with Andrew Litton and the Dallas Symphony Orchestra.

Meyers asked the jazz star Wynton Marsalis to write cadenzas for her in Mozart's Violin Concerto No. 3 in G Major, which she premiered with the Utah Symphony Orchestra in 2009. Meyers commissioned Mason Bates to write his first violin concerto, and she performed in the world premiere with Leonard Slatkin and the Pittsburgh Symphony Orchestra in December 2012. It was later recorded with the London Symphony Orchestra under Leonard Slatkin and released on Meyers' 2014 album, The American Masters. She has performed the work with the Chicago Symphony Orchestra, Detroit Symphony Orchestra, Orchestre National de Lyon, and New Zealand Symphony Orchestra.

On September 30, 2014, Meyers released The American Masters, which includes two world premieres: Mason Bates's Violin Concerto and the Lullaby for Natalie by John Corigliano, written for the birth of her first-born daughter, Natalie. The album also includes Samuel Barber's Violin Concerto.

Meyers appeared in a nationwide PBS broadcast special aired in fall 2015 featuring the world premiere of Samuel Jones' Violin Concerto with the All-Star Orchestra led by Gerard Schwarz. The performance was also part of a Naxos Records DVD.

In September 2015, Meyers released Serenade: The Love Album, her 34th album, featuring Leonard Bernstein's epic Serenade. Meyers commissioned seven arrangers including Adam Schoenberg, Brad Dechter, J.A.C. Redford and Steven Mercurio to arrange ten love-inspired works from classic movies and the American Songbook. The seven arrangers were chosen to resemble the seven philosophers of Plato's Symposium, which Bernstein's Serenade is based on. The album was recorded with the London Symphony Orchestra with Keith Lockhart conducting.

Meyers performed the posthumous world premiere of Fantasia by Einojuhani Rautavaara, written for her, with the Kansas City Symphony conducted by Michael Stern in March 2017. Meyers met Rautavaara at his home in December 2015 to play the work for him. He died in July 2016 before its first public performance nearly a year later.

Adam Schoenberg's first violin concerto, Orchard in Fog, written for Meyers, was premiered by her with the San Diego Symphony and conductor Sameer Patel in February 2018. The Violin Channel live-streamed the performance, acquiring the most views of any live video on the website to date.

In May 2020, Meyers released the world premiere recording of Arvo Pärt's Estonian Lullaby for violin and piano, which was dedicated to her. She also released an accompanying animated watercolor video, produced in collaboration with Skazka Studios.

In July 2021, Meyers premiered John Corigliano's new cadenzas to Beethoven's Violin Concerto in D Major, Op. 61 at the Brevard Music Center with conductor Keith Lockhart.

The next month, in August 2021, Meyers gave the world premiere of Arturo Marquez's violin concerto, Fandango, at the Hollywood Bowl with Gustavo Dudamel. She went on to perform the work at Carnegie Hall and at the 10,000-seat Auditorio Nacional in Mexico City in October 2022 with the Los Angeles Philharmonic and Gustavo Dudamel, and to champion the work with many other orchestras across the country.

In November 2022, Meyers premiered Blue Electra by Michael Daugherty – a work written for Meyers and dedicated to Amelia Earhart – with the National Symphony Orchestra led by Gianandrea Noseda at the Kennedy Center, which was broadcast by medici.tv.

Billboard charts 
Air – The Bach Album debuted at No. 1 on the US Billboard charts on its release on February 14, 2012. It featured "Bach Double" played on two different Stradivarius violins.

Meyers' performance of The Vivaldi Four Seasons Album debuted at No. 1 on the US Billboard charts when released on February 14, 2014.

Meyers was the top-selling classical instrumentalist of 2014 on Billboards traditional classical charts.

Discography 

The following releases feature Meyers on violin.

Music videos 
Vivaldi Triple Concerto – Anne Akiko Meyers Performs all 3 Parts
Summer from Vivaldi's Four Seasons
Winter from Vivaldi's Four Seasons
On the Tonight Show with Johnny Carson at age 11

Awards and honors 
In 1993 at the age of 23, Meyers was the sole recipient of the Avery Fisher Career Grant, which is awarded by Lincoln Center for the Performing Arts to up to five promising young artists each year.

In 2006, she served as a panelist, recitalist, and teacher at the Juilliard School's Starling-DeLay Symposium. In May 2008, UCLA invited her to be the Regent's Lecturer in violin.

In late 2009, Meyers joined the Butler School of Music at University of Texas at Austin as Distinguished Artist and Professor of Violin.

In September 2015, she was honored with a Luminary Award by the Pasadena Symphony for her long-standing support of that orchestra.

In December 2022, Meyers was named a new trustee of The Juilliard School alongside singer songwriter Jon Batiste.

Personal life 
Meyers lives with her husband and two daughters in Los Angeles, California.

References

External links 
 
 Colbert Artists page for Anne Akiko Meyers

American classical violinists
Child classical musicians
American classical musicians of Japanese descent
Living people
Women classical violinists
American people of Jewish descent
American women musicians of Japanese descent
21st-century American women musicians
Classical musicians from California
21st-century classical violinists
21st-century American violinists